UFC 39: The Warriors Return was a mixed martial arts event held by the Ultimate Fighting Championship on September 27, 2002, at the Mohegan Sun Arena in Uncasville, Connecticut. The event was broadcast live on pay per view in the United States, and was the first UFC event to be released on DVD.

History
Headlining the event was a Heavyweight Title bout between Randy Couture and Ricco Rodriguez for the vacant title. Originally Ricco Rodriguez was scheduled to fight Josh Barnett for the UFC tile but Barnett was stripped following a positive test for steroids.

The event marked the octagon debut of future UFC Heavyweight Champion Tim Sylvia. This fight saw Sylvia's opponent, Wesley Correira, take several straight punches, knees, and kicks to the head without ever falling before his corner eventually threw in the towel.

Results

Lightweight tournament bracket

1 At UFC 41, B.J. Penn vs. Caol Uno ended in a split draw. (48-46, 47-48, 48-48). The title remained vacant.

See also
 Ultimate Fighting Championship
 List of UFC champions
 List of UFC events
 2002 in UFC

External links 
 Official UFC Website
 ESPN.com: Page 2 : Sodom, Gomorrah and the UFC

Ultimate Fighting Championship events
Events in Uncasville, Connecticut
2002 in mixed martial arts
Mixed martial arts in Connecticut
Sports in Uncasville, Connecticut
2002 in sports in Connecticut